143 is the debut studio album by British pop duo Bars and Melody. It was released in the United Kingdom on the 21 August 2015. The album peaked at number 4 on the UK Albums Chart. The album includes the singles "Hopeful", "Keep Smiling" and "Stay Strong".

Singles
"Hopeful" was released as the lead single from the album on 27 July 2014. The song peaked at number 5 on the UK Singles Chart. "Keep Smiling" was released as the second single from the album on 16 February 2015. The song peaked at number 52 on the UK Singles Chart. "Stay Strong" was released as the third single from the album on 5 April 2015. The song peaked at number 53 on the UK Singles Chart.

Track listing

Charts

Certifications

Release history

References

2015 debut albums
143 Records albums
Bars and Melody albums